Gabriel Reinaldo Graciani (born 16 February 1982) is an Argentine football manager and former professional footballer who played as a right-back. He is currently the manager of Patronato's reserves.

Playing career
Graciani spent the majority of his senior career with Patronato. He made his debut in Torneo Argentino A during 2001–02, a season which ended with relegation to Torneo Argentino B. Patronato remained in tier three until 2008, during which time Graciani had scored six goals in ninety-eight matches. He stayed with the club in Primera B Nacional until 2015, departing after two hundred and fifty-eight appearances and ten goals. His final season, 2015, ended with promotion to the Argentine Primera División. Graciani's final clubs were Belgrano (2016) and Deportivo Bovril (2017), a team he played for during his youth career.

Coaching career
In June 2019, Graciani was appointed reserve manager by former club Patronato; having previously been a youth assistant coach there.

Personal life
Graciani is the uncle and namesake of current footballer Gabriel Graciani.

Honours
Patronato
Torneo Argentino B: 2007–08
Torneo Argentino A: 2009–10

References

External links

1982 births
Living people
Sportspeople from Entre Ríos Province
Argentine footballers
Argentine football managers
Association football defenders
Torneo Argentino B players
Torneo Argentino A players
Primera Nacional players
Club Atlético Patronato footballers